Bagels & Brownies is a retail venture based in New Delhi started by Adnan 
Vahanvaty, a food fanatic having eminent experience in food industry. 

Bagel is a bread product specially made and shaped by hand into forms of ring with yeasted wheat dough which is first boiled in fresh water and then baked resulting in a dense chewy interior and crispy exterior.

Two traditional types of bagels are Montreal-style bagel and New York-style bagel.

Bagels & Brownies is a specialised bakery concept with an aim of providing international taste to India palates.
Bagels & Brownies is a brand of confections and bakes in Delhi/NCR.

References

External links 
 Company website
 Bakery Magazine article
 Business Standard article
 Business Standard coverage of Adnan Vahanvaty

Bagel companies
Companies based in New Delhi
Food and drink companies based in Delhi